"De Brevitate Vitae" (Latin for "On the Shortness of Life"), more commonly known as "Gaudeamus igitur" ("So Let Us Rejoice") or just "Gaudeamus", is a popular academic commercium song in many European countries, mainly sung or performed at university graduation ceremonies. Despite its use as a formal graduation hymn, it is a jocular, light-hearted composition that pokes fun at university life. The song is thought to originate in a Latin manuscript from 1287. It is in the tradition of carpe diem ("seize the day") with its exhortations to enjoy life. It was known as a beer-drinking song in many early universities and is the official song of many schools, colleges, universities, institutions, student societies and is the official anthem of the International University Sports Federation.

Content
The lyrics reflect an endorsement of the bacchanalian mayhem of student life while simultaneously retaining the grim knowledge that one day we will all die. The song contains humorous and ironic references to sex and death, and many versions have appeared following efforts to bowdlerise this song for performance in public ceremonies. In private, students will typically sing ribald words.

The song is sometimes known by its opening words, "Gaudeamus igitur" or simply "Gaudeamus". In the UK, it is sometimes affectionately known as "The Gaudie". The centuries of use have given rise to numerous slightly different versions.

Lyrics
The proposition that the lyrics originate in 1287 is based on a manuscript held in the Bibliothèque nationale de France in Paris. A poem starting with the words Subscribere proposui ("I have suggested signing (it)") has two verses that closely resemble the later Gaudeamus igitur verses, although neither the first verse nor the actual words Gaudeamus igitur appear. The music accompanying this poem bears no relation to the melody which is now associated with it. A German translation of these verses was made in about 1717 and published in 1730 without music. A Latin version in a handwritten student songbook, dating from some time between 1723 and 1750, is preserved in the Berlin State Library (formerly located at Marburg); however, this differs considerably from the modern text. The current Latin lyrics with a German translation were published by Halle in 1781 in Studentenlieder ("Students' Songs") written by Christian Wilhelm Kindleben (1748-1785), who admitted to making important changes to the text.

Below is Kindleben's 1781 Latin version, with two translations to English (one anonymous, and another by Tr. J. Mark Sugars, 1997). The New-Latin word Antiburschius refers to opponents of the 19th-century politically active German student fraternities. The letters 'j' and 'u' used in some modern transcriptions do not occur in classical Latin.

When sung, the first two lines and the last line of each stanza are repeated; for instance:
Gaudeamus igitur,
Iuvenes dum sumus,
Gaudeamus igitur,
Iuvenes dum sumus,
Post jucundam juventutem,
Post molestam senectutem,
Nos habebit humus,
Nos habebit humus.

Music
The first appearance in print of the present melody was in Lieder für Freunde der Geselligen Freude ("Songs for Friends of Convivial Joy"), published in Leipzig in 1782, together with Kindleben's German lyrics; however, the tune was evidently well known before this date. The first publication of the present Latin text together with the present melody was probably in Ignaz Walter's 1797 operatic setting of Doktor Faust. It is also heard in Berlioz' Damnation of Faust.

Johannes Brahms quoted the melody in the final section of his Academic Festival Overture, in a fortissimo rendition performed by the full orchestra.

Sigmund Romberg used it in the operetta The Student Prince, which is set at the University of Heidelberg.

It is quoted in Johann Strauss II's "Studenten-Polka" (Française, Op.263), first performed at the students' ball at the Redoutensaal on 24 February 1862.

The tune is quoted, along with other student songs, in the overture of Franz von Suppé's 1863 operetta Flotte Burschen, the action being once again set at the University of Heidelberg.

Basing it on the original melody, Franz Liszt has composed the Gaudeamus igitur—Paraphrase and later (1870) the Gaudeamus igitur—Humoreske.

Modern version is rearrangement for male chorus with piano accompaniment, by Pyotr Tchaikovsky (1874) (TH 187 ; ČW 413).

Languages in which the anthem was performed at the World University Games

In popular culture
 The melody is woven through the soundtrack of Harold Lloyd's silent film The Freshman (1925).
 It can be heard in the classic 1939 film The Wizard of Oz, during part of the sequence where the Wizard presents awards to each of Dorothy's companions.
 The song is sung in the James Stewart movie The Mortal Storm (1940).
 It was sung in Howard Hawks' Ball of Fire (1941) by a number of academics at a party where they are celebrating the upcoming nuptials of a professor played by Gary Cooper.
 It is sung in the remake of Ball of Fire, A Song Is Born (1948), starring Danny Kaye.
 It is performed as the musical theme of the classic 1951 Joseph L. Mankiewicz's film People Will Talk, delightfully "conducted" by Cary Grant – actually under Alfred Newman's baton. This film is a remake of the German Frauenarzt Dr. Praetorius, in which actor/director Curt Goetz performs that scene with the same music in the film based on his own play and screenplay.
 In Yasujirō Ozu’s 1952 film The Flavor of Green Tea over Rice (Ochazuke no Aji), the first verse is sung in a Tokyo bar by a young man who has just graduated and is about to embark on his working life.
 The song is sung on several occasions during the film The Student Prince, (1954), starring Edmund Purdom and Ann Blyth.
 The music is played at the end of the Perry Mason TV episode "The Case of the Brazen Request," (Season 5, Episode 12, Sept. 1961) during Perry's characteristic "wrap up" of the case.
 Peter Alexander sings this song in a medley in the 1963 film Der Musterknabe.
 An arrangement of the tune is played on The Andy Griffith Show episode "The Education of Ernest T. Bass" (1964), when Bass receives his diploma.
 In the film Lord Love a Duck (1966), a fairly modern vocal version is sung during graduation ceremonies.
 The Happy Days episode "Fonzie Drops In" (1974) plays the melody when the character Fonzie goes back to high school.
 It is alluded to in the Terry Pratchett novel Equal Rites (1987), where the character Treatle misquotes it: "Alma mater, gaudy armours eagle tour and so on."
 A modified version can be heard in some episodes of the Saturday-morning cartoon Spider-Man and His Amazing Friends.
 The melody also served as the music of the fictional school, Greenleaf High anthem, 'Hail To Thee O Greenleaf High' in the 1997 film In and Out.
 The song is sung in Lars von Trier's 1997 Danish TV mini-series Riget II, by a group of medical students as a sign of appreciation to their pathology teacher Professor Bondo, as a response to the latter having let a malign sarcoma be transplanted into his own bowels.
This song was used in PopCap Games' Bookworm Deluxe high-score menu.
 An excerpt of the song was performed by cast members of the television series The West Wing during the episode entitled "Debate Camp" (2002). Afterward, one character is asked by another what the lyrics mean, and he gives a standard English translation of the first verse.
 A sped-up orchestral version of the song plays shortly during a scene of the characters chasing a pet pig in the 2013 film Monsters University.
 In the 2013 Dutch film , the song is sung to uplift spirits, after a party of the fictional student society HSV Mercurius is shut down by riot police. Singing the song makes them feel proud to be students, as they stand their ground against the riot police.
 Yale University alumna Jodie Foster included a slightly sped-up version of the Yale Glee Club's 1991 a cappella recording of the song, arranged and conducted by legendary YGC Director Fenno Heath, in her 1991 film Little Man Tate. She wished to express "the grandeur of the college experience" on exceptionally-gifted-child character Fred Tate's first day at university.
 The song's title is featured in several section headings in Infinite Jest.
 This song is sung at Smith College's convocation ceremony in Northampton, Massachusetts at the start of every academic year. It is known as Smith's anthem.
 "Gaudeamus Igitur" is a short story by Shirley Jackson that appears in 2015 posthumously published collection titled Let Me Tell You: New Stories, Essays, and Other Writing. 
 The song was often heard in Tiny Toon Adventures in establishing shots of Acme Looniversity.

Recordings
 This song is referenced in satirist Tom Lehrer's song "Bright College Days"  in his 1959 self-published album More of Tom Lehrer and in his more-recent album An Evening Wasted with Tom Lehrer, in the line "Turn on the spigot, pour the beer and swig it, and gaudeamus ig-it-[hic!]-itur", the interruption being an intoxicated hiccup.
 In the middle section of the Allan Sherman song "Dropouts March" (on the album Allan in Wonderland (1964)), an Alma Mater Chorus sings the following humorous line set to the melody: "Ignoramus there you are; Sitting in your hopped-up car; And your brains ain't up to par; And your ears stick out too far".
This song is on the full version of Melanie's "Stop I Don't Want to Hear It Anymore" from 1971.
 The song is referenced in the Godley & Creme song "Punchbag" from their L album.
 A performance of the first, most characteristic strophe was recorded in the mid-20th century by the Italian-American tenor Mario Lanza, and is still available under the title "Gaudeamus Igitur".
 A doo wop version is available by the Escorts, from 1962, perhaps the only doo wop song sung in Latin. (Coral 62317)

See also
 Ars longa, vita brevis
 Gaudy
 Ubi sunt

References

External links

 Hoffmann von Fallersleben, Gustav Schwetschke: Gaudeamus igitur. Eine Studie von Hoffmann von Fallersleben. Nebst einem Sendschreiben und Carmen an Denselben von Gustav Schwetschke. Halle, 1872.

Other (often non-original but altered) text variants:

 Johann Christian Christoph Rüdiger (editor, published as only "R-d-r"): Auswahl guter Trinklieder, oder Töne der Freude und des Weins, beym freundschaftlichen Mahle anzustimmen. Aus den besten Dichtern gesammlet. –  Trink- oder Commersch-Lieder, beym freundschaftlichen Mahle zu singen, aus den besten Dichtern gesammlet. 2nd edition, Hendelscher Verlag, Halle 1795, p. 142–143.
 Neues deutsches allgemeines Commers- und Liederbuch. Germania, 1815, p. 20–21 and 180–183 (Das neue Gaudeamus).
 Leipziger Commersbuch. Bei Karl Tauchnitz, Leipzig, 1816, p. 106–108.
 Berlinisches Commersbuch. Bey Theodor Joh. Chr. Fr. Enslin, Berlin, 1817, p. 27–28 and 158–159 (Das neue Gaudeamus).
 Neues Commersbuch. Germania, 1818, p. 42–43.
 Neues teutsches allgemeines Commers- und Liederbuch. 3rd edition, Germania, 1820 (Tübingen in der Osiander'schen Buchhandlung), p. 25–26.
 Auswahl deutscher Volks- und Burschen-Lieder. Gedruckt und verlegt von der Deckerschen Geheimen Ober-Hofbuchdruckerei, Berlin, 1821, p. 113–114.
 Urceus Lebensreise. – Meine Lebensreise. In sechs Stazionen zur Belehrung der Jugend und zur Unterhaltung des Alters beschrieben von Urceus. Nebst Franz Volkmar Reinhard's Briefen an den Verfasser. Leipzig, 1825, p. 179–180 containg Das neue Gaudeamus (The new Gaudeamus).
 Deutsche Studenten-Lieder des siebzehnten und achtzehnten Jahrhunderts. Nach alten Handschriften gesammelt und mit einleitenden Bemerkungen über die geschichte des deutschen Studentenliedes versehen von Dr. Robert Keil und Dr. Richard Keil. Verlag von M. Schauenburg & C., Lahr, p. 165–167 having „Gaudeamus igitur. (Jenenser Blatt vom Jahr 1776.)“.
 a medical travesty, by Kayser from Breslau:
 Archivii italiani di laringologia periodico trimestrale. Anno X.   Ottobre 1890   Fasc. 4. Napoli, 1890, p. 180–181.
 Internationales Centralblatt für Laryngologie, Rhinologie und verwandte Wissenschaften. Siebenter Jahrgang. (Juli 1890 bis Juni 1891.) Berlin, 1891, p. 132–133.
 
 . Gaudeamus igitur, lyrics in Latin, English, German, Finnish and Esperanto, midi melody
 
 

Songs:
 De Brevitate Vitae performed by the Roosevelt Academy Choir
 Gaudeamus Igitur sung at Smith College convocation, 2008 Note the stomping and enthusiasm for the "Vivat academia!" and "Vivant professores" lines.
 Gaudeamus Igitur. Full Latin version. Sung by Basil Billow (audio)

Commercium songs
Latin-language songs
Latin words and phrases
Graduation songs
Universiade
Sporting songs